The Research and Analysis Center (TRAC), formerly the TRADOC Analysis Center, is an analysis agency of the United States Army. TRAC conducts research on potential military operations worldwide to inform decisions about the most challenging issues facing the Army and the Department of Defense (DoD). TRAC relies upon the intellectual capital of a highly skilled workforce of military and civilian personnel to execute its mission. 

TRAC conducts operations research (OR) on a wide range of military topics, some contemporary but most often set five to 15 years in the future.  TRAC directly supports the mission of the Army Futures Command (AFC), to develop future concepts and requirements while also serving the decision needs of many military clients.

Mission statement 
To produce relevant and credible operations analysis to inform decisions.

Organization 
TRAC is led by a civilian SES director, subordinate to the Commanding General of the US Army Futures Command. It comprises four centers:
 TRAC-Fort Leavenworth (TRAC-FLVN), led by a civilian SES director, is co-located with TRAC headquarters at Fort Leavenworth, Kansas and has traditionally conducted analysis at the operational (Corps and division) level.
 TRAC-White Sands Missile Range (TRAC-WSMR), led by a civilian SES director, is located at White Sands Missile Range in New Mexico and has traditionally conducted analysis at the tactical Brigade and below level.
 TRAC-LEE, led by a led by a lieutenant colonel, is co-located with the Combined Arms Support Command (CASCOM) located at Fort Lee, VA and has traditionally conducted analysis in the area of Sustainment, which includes Logistics and other support functions such as medical and personnel. 
 TRAC-Monterey, also led by a lieutenant colonel, is co-located with the Naval Postgraduate School (NPS) in Monterey, CA and has traditionally utilized the resources of NPS to conduct research into new models and methodologies.

Each center director is subordinate to the TRAC director.

Program 
The TRAC program of operations research and analysis is forward-looking and addresses a wide range of military topics. The analysis is conducted within a joint framework of combined arms operations across a full spectrum of missions and environments. TRAC leads major studies of new warfighting operations and organization (O&O) concepts and requirements, and Acquisition Category (ACAT) I and special interest ACAT II and II and   Analysis of Alternatives (AoA) in line with the JCIDS process. Research topics span doctrine, training, leader development, organization, materiel, and soldier support (DOTMLPF).

Director, TRAC is the Army Futures Command executive agent for developing scenarios for use in studies and analysis. TRAC develops scenarios of potential military operations set in the future for use in modeling and analysis.

References

External links
 U.S. Army The Research and Analysis Center (TRAC)

Operations research
Fort Leavenworth